The Flash: Vertical Velocity (formerly known as V2: Vertical Velocity) is a steel Inverted Impulse roller coaster located at Six Flags Discovery Kingdom in Vallejo, California. It is California's first and only inverting Inverted Impulse Coaster, built by Intamin and opened on June 8, 2001.

History
Both sides of the track were vertical, the front tower twisted and the rear tower straight with a reverse LIM segment at the top (designed to hold the train momentarily).

For the 2007 season, V2 was repainted red with maroon supports. Before the repainting, it had a yellow track with blue supports, which made this ride's paint scheme very similar to the defunct coaster Wicked Twister at Cedar Point, which had also had a yellow track and supports that were a lighter shade of teal.

Vertical Velocity closed for extensive refurbishment in early 2016, which included the removal and complete disassembly and refurbishment of the train. Sections of track and queue railings were also removed as part of this refurbishment.

On April 3, 2019, the park sent a newsletter announcing renovations to rebrand the coaster into The Flash: Vertical Velocity, which would open next to the park's new 4-D coaster, Batman: The Ride. The opening of the two coasters rebranded that area of the park to a DC Comics-themed land, standing along with Superman: Ultimate Flight, and The Joker. Vertical Velocity's supports were painted yellow for the new theme.

Following the reopening of the park after its prolonged closure from the COVID-19 pandemic, The Flash once again was dormant, with barricades blocking the hill leading to the line in favor of a Mask Relief Area, where parkgoers could take off their personal masks if they so chose. The Flash's train was once again removed, this time going completely missing, whereas during the prior refurbishment to turn the coaster into The Flash, the train was disassembled and subsequently reassembled in the station.

The frame of the train is currently in the walk up area to the coaster.

The flash will once again thrill riders again as it will reopen this year (Six Flags App says,”coming soon.”)

Ride experience
The roller coaster's layout is akin to a large vertical U shape, that is loaded at the base and uses a series of LIMs to accelerate the train up each side of the track. One side of the track is twisted track (commonly called an inline twist) that ends in a straight section angled at about 45 degrees, the other side is a perfectly vertical straight track. The train seats 28 riders in an inverted roller coaster design.

Timeline
 2001 - The Flash: Vertical Velocity opens as V2: Vertical Velocity.
 2002 - V2 is modified so both its towers are 150 feet, and its back tower has a 45-degree angle.
 2007 - V2 receives a repaint with red track & maroon supports.
 2019 - V2: Vertical Velocity is repainted and its track is given a darker shade of red while the supports become yellow. It is also given a retheme to the Flash and renamed "The Flash: Vertical Velocity.

References

External links 
 

Roller coasters operated by Six Flags
Roller coasters introduced in 2001
Six Flags Discovery Kingdom
Roller coasters in California